CGS C.D. Howe was a Canadian Arctic patrol vessel tasked with controversial missions that served first with the Department of Transport, then the Canadian Coast Guard. Conceived as a way to make Canada's presence in the Arctic more visible, C.D. Howe entered service in 1950. The ship would make an annual voyage to Canada's north in the summer months, visiting remote communities to resupply them and to provide medical and dental services. The patrol vessel would sometimes remove members of Aboriginal communities to the south for further treatment. The ship was also involved in a forced resettlement of Inuit families in the High Arctic. During winter months, C.D. Howe provided services in the Gulf of St. Lawrence. In 1962, the ship joined the Canadian Coast Guard and was given the new prefix CCGS. C.D. Howe was deemed obsolete in 1969 and taken out of service. In 1970 the vessel was sold, becoming an accommodation vessel in Greenland before being broken up for scrap in 1975.

Description
C.D. Howe was designed to be a multi-purpose vessel capable of navigating in Arctic waters. The ship was capable of icebreaking and was equipped for meteorological and oceanographic survey missions along with acting as a hospital ship. The vessel was designed to be a potential naval auxiliary in times of war. The ship's hull was of streamlined design, reinforced for service in Arctic waters.

The ship was powered by a Skinner uniflow steam engine rated at  driving two screws. The uniflow engine was considered superior to steam and diesel engines at the time. The vessel had a complement of 58 and accommodation for 88 passengers. C.D. Howe was equipped with a helicopter deck for use by helicopters, the first in government service outside of the Royal Canadian Navy. The ship had a hangar added later. On its initial voyage, C.D. Howe embarked a Sikorsky S-51 helicopter for trials. The following year, the ship embarked a smaller Bell 47 helicopter for ice reconnaissance use.

Service history
C.D. Howe was the second vessel in the postwar government construction program. Constructed by Davie Shipbuilding at their yard in Lauzon, Quebec with the yard number 588, C.D. Howe was launched on 7 September 1949 and completed in June 1950. Named for a former Canadian Minister of Transport, the vessel entered service with the Department of Transport's fleet in 1950. The ship was based at Quebec City.

During summer months, C.D. Howe made an annual voyage to the Eastern Arctic. During winter months, C.D. Howe performed icebreaking operations in the Gulf of St. Lawrence. The vessel was also used to train Canadian Coast Guard College cadets. The ship's annual voyage to the Eastern Arctic consisted of resupplying northern settlements, activating navigation aids in the north and providing medical and dental services to remote communities. C.D. Howe carried personnel from the Departments of Natural Resources and Northern Affairs along with members of the Royal Canadian Mounted Police while performing its duties. The annual trip would take the vessel to northern Labrador, along the south and east coasts of Baffin Island and stopping at Ellesmere Island. C.D. Howe operated as a hospital ship, carrying two doctors, two dentists and two nurses while travelling through the Arctic. The ship stopped at remote Aboriginal communities and provided medical services to the inhabitants, while also screening them for signs of tuberculosis. This was at times, performed against the will of the inhabitants, with the vessel forcibly removing those Aboriginals who were considered by the medical professionals aboard to need further care. The forcible removal of some of those patients, sometimes without warning to family members, caused distress among the remote populations, causing some to flee the sight of the ship upon its arrival in Aboriginal communities. As part of Canada's attempt to assert sovereignty over its Arctic territory, C.D. Howe, along with the icebreaker , relocated Inuit that had been removed from their settlement at Port Harrison to new communities at Resolute and Grise Fiord in August and September 1953. In 1962, C.D. Howe, along with the rest of the Department of Transport's maritime fleet, was transferred to the newly created Canadian Coast Guard and the vessel was given the new prefix CCGS.

The ship made its final Arctic voyage in 1969. In 1970, C.D. Howe was taken out of service after air transportation and communication made the ship redundant. The ship was sold to Marine Salvage Ltd and registered in Ottawa. The vessel was resold in 1971 to Vestgron Mines Ltd and registered in Ottawa for use as an accommodation ship for workers at the Black Angel Mine in Maamorilik, Greenland. The ship was sold again in 1974 to Windward Sg Co Ltd and registered in Panama. On 1 July 1975 the ship was sold for scrap to Desguaces Condal and broken up in Barcelona, Spain.

Notes

Citations

Sources
 
 
 
 
  
 

Patrol vessels of the Canadian Coast Guard
Canadian Government Ship
1949 ships
Ships built in Quebec